Stanley Main Beach is a gazetted beach located adjacent to Stanley Market and Stanley Back Beach in the eastern side of the Stanley peninsula, Southern District, Hong Kong. The beach has barbecue pits and is managed by the Leisure and Cultural Services Department of the Hong Kong Government. The beach is about 194 metres long and is rated as Grade 1 by the Environmental Protection Department for its water quality.

Usage
The beach is a hot spot for windsurfing and other watersports, and hosts the Dragon Boat Championships every year.

Features
The beach has the following features:
 BBQ pits (13 nos.)
 Changing rooms
 Showers
 Toilets
 Fast food kiosk
 Water sports centre
 Playground

See also
 Beaches of Hong Kong

References

External links 

 Official website

Stanley, Hong Kong
Beaches of Hong Kong